Chinese Film Media Awards (华语电影传媒大奖) are presented by Southern Metropolis Daily annually to honor excellence in Chinese-language cinema. Though based in mainland China, the awards are open to Chinese-language films from Hong Kong, Taiwan and Singapore.

In 2017, the award was held under the name of 2017 Film Gala, and additional awards were introduced.

China region

Major award winners

Newcomer awards

Popularity awards

Hong Kong/Taiwan region

Major awards

Popularity awards

Most Anticipated awards

References

External links
 Chinese Film Media Awards on Internet Movie Database

 

Chinese film awards
Annual events in China